The Common Entrance Examination for Design (CEED) is a joint entrance exam for post-graduate studies in the field of technological design. The exams are held annually at all Indian Institutes of Technology (IITs) and Indian Institutes of Science (IIScs). The examination is hosted by the Industrial Design Centre, Indian Institute of Technology Bombay on behalf of Ministry of Human Resource Development, Government of India. The CEED is a descriptive test covering a student's logical, creative, observation and drawing skills, tested in particular for admission to various design courses in the fields of product design, industrial design, visual communication, animation graphics, vehicle design and mobility.

Though the eligibility criteria to appear for the CEED is a graduate degree (10,+1,+2) but graduate's who have completed 3 year degree (10,+1,+2) course please note, all listed IITs in the CEED website have their respective eligibility mentioned as 10,+1,+2. Even if in future a student who holds 3 year UG degree but manages to get 1st All India Ranking in CEED exam, they will not be eligible for any of the design related course in IITs.

Eligibility
There is no bar to either the age of the candidate or the number of times a candidate can take the exam. 

All qualified candidates with a valid CEED Examination score (CEED qualified candidates with UG Degree (10+2+3) not eligible for IITs and IISc) become eligible to apply for admission to various design programs under IITs and IISc. A valid CEED score does not, however, promise admission to the desired institute. Candidates are required to appear for a second test known as the Design Aptitude Test (DAT) followed by an interview prior to final selection by the respective institutes.

Though the basic eligibility criteria to appear for the CEED exam is a UG Graduation degree (10+2+3), a graduate who has completed a 3-year degree (10+2+3) course please note, all listed IITs and IISC on the CEED website have their respective eligibility mentioned as 10+2+4. Even if in future a talented design student who holds 3 year UG degree but manages to get 1st All India Ranking in the tough CEED exam, they will not be eligible for any of the design-related course offered in IITs and IISc because they are one year short in the UG graduate degree program.

All the CEED Result Sharing Institutes (private colleges) mentioned in the CEED website, in their respective websites, have mentioned joining their MDes PG program eligibility is minimum UG Degree (10+2+3) and students who have passed CEED exams and students from the open general category are eligible to join their design program.

Examination pattern
From 2013, CEED has changed its examination pattern. Now the examination is conducted in three stages: Part A, Part B, and an interview.

Part A is a preliminary screening test. There are about 50 questions in this part having negative marking. Correct answers carry +2.0 marks and wrong answers carry -0.5 marks (negative). Each question in this part checks general knowledge and awareness. Part B is evaluated for those candidates who are short listed in the screening test (Part A). Each question in this part examines the drawing and creative skills of the candidate. The first two parts are mandatory and the interview is carried for those who clear both Part A and Part B.

Part A covers the following categories:   

 Visual communication - this includes logos, signage, packaging, fonts etc.
 Animation design - includes movement observation, comic strips, visuals etc.
 Product design - covers the latest and newest products and trends, current products etc.
 Automobile design - relates to aesthetics, manufacturers and plants etc.
 Digital (applied to almost all the fields) - relates to photography, color coding, displays, printing etc.
 Observation and visualisation (basic designer skills) - something like mirroring, textures, evolution (past to present), isometrics and geometry, tessellations, shadows and more.
 Architecture - covers sculpture, monuments, materials etc.
 General awareness - includes engineering ability, materials, culture of the country, famous personalities and their works, instruments, animals etc.

Part B comprises the following categories:

 Basic and visual sketching - that might include objective, perceptive and imaginative types
 Observation, problem identification and problem solving 
 Design think-ability - relates mostly to the design streams like product/industrial, interaction design and User interface design
 Visual communication design in the form of posters or logo
 Animation design in the form of comic strips, character framing etc.

Those who clear Part A and Part B are required to prepare a portfolio to produce during the interview.

CEED syllabus:

Part A:
 Visualization and Spatial Ability.
 Environmental and Social Awareness.
 Analytical and Logical Reasoning.
 Language and Creativity.
 Design Thinking and Problem Solving.
 Observation and Design Sensitivity.

Part B
 Drawing.
 Creativity.
 Communication Skills.
 Problem Identification Skills.

Programmes

A CEED qualified candidate can apply for the following programmes in designing in IIT's, IISc Bangalore, SNU and UPES:

Master of Design programmes (MDes, M.Des. or M.Design)
IISc, Bangalore - M.Des. in Product Design and Engineering (CPDM)
IIT Bombay - M.Des. in Industrial design, Visual Communication, Animation, Interaction Design, Mobility and Vehicle Design
IIT Delhi - M.Des. in Industrial Design
SPA New Delhi - M.Des. in Industrial Design
IIT Hyderabad - M.Des. in Visual Design
IIT Guwahati - M.Des. in Design, Electronic Product Design 
IIT Kanpur - M.Des. in Design
IIT Roorkee - M.Des. in Design
IIITDM Jabalpur - M.Des. in Design
IIITDM Kancheepuram - M.Des. in Design
Delhi Technological University - M.Des. in Interaction Design, Visual Communication, Product Design, Transportation Design and Service Design
Shiv Nadar University - M.Des. in Strategic Product Design, Visual Communication, User Experience Design and Information Design
School of Design Studies - UPES Dehradun  - M.Des. in Industrial design, Product Design, Interior Design, Transportation Design

Ph.D Programmes in Design
  IISc Bangalore, IIT Bombay, IIT Hyderabad and IIT Kanpur

See also
 IIT Bombay
 Industrial Design Centre
 University of Petroleum and Energy Studies

References

External links
 

Standardised tests in India
Indian design